Arthur 'Adrian' Haydon (1911 – 12 September 1973)  was a male international table tennis player from England.

Table tennis career
He started playing table tennis aged just 7 years-old. During the 1927-28 season he was world ranked 6. He won fourteen medals in singles, doubles, and team events in the World Table Tennis Championships from 1928 to 1953, including a gold medal at the 1953 World Table Tennis Championships in the Swaythling Cup (men's team event).

Personal life
He married international player Doris Jordan in 1938.

He is the father of Ann Haydon Jones, a finalist at the World Table Tennis Championships and a Grand Slam winner in tennis.

He also played for the Warwickshire County Cricket Club 2nd XI.

See also
 List of table tennis players
 List of World Table Tennis Championships medalists
 List of England players at the World Team Table Tennis Championships

References

English male table tennis players
1911 births
1973 deaths